In the United Kingdom, the term listed building refers to a building or other structure officially designated as being of special architectural, historical, or cultural significance; Grade I structures are those considered to be "buildings of exceptional interest". Listing was begun by a provision in the Town and Country Planning Act 1947. Once listed, strict limitations are imposed on the modifications allowed to a building's structure or fittings. In Wales, the authority for listing under the Planning (Listed Buildings and Conservation Areas) Act 1990 rests with Cadw.

Buildings

|}

See also

 Grade II* listed buildings in Conwy County Borough
 Listed buildings in Wales
 List of scheduled monuments in Conwy
 Registered historic parks and gardens in Conwy County Borough

Notes

References

External links

 
Conwy County Borough I